Lev Leonidovich (Aronovich) Shvartzman (25 July 1907  13 May 1955) was a Soviet MGB officer, notorious for his brutality, who was executed for using torture to extract false confessions from prisoners. His victims included Marshal Blyukher, the writer Isaac Babel and the theatre director Vsevolod Meyerhold.

Biography

Early career 
He was born in Shpola, in Ukraine, the son of a Jewish bank official. During the Russian Civil War, his parents supported the White army against the Bolsheviks. His father served in the army of General Yudenich, and was killed in battle in 1919. His mother served as a military doctor. His two brothers fought in the army of Rüdiger von der Goltz. Lev Shvartzman left school at 14. 

Despite his family background, he was allowed to join Komsomol in 1925. Having worked as a newspaper seller, he was taken on as a reporter in Kiev, and in February 1929, was transferred to Moscow  to work for the newspaper Moskovski Komsomolets.

NKVD career 
Shvartzman was recruited to the NKVD in 1935 and rapidly advanced during the Great Purge. In mid-1938, he was put in charge of investigating writers, artists, and publishers but was considered ineffective so was given the job of conducting 'intensive investigations'. Put in charge of forcing a confession out of Vasily Blyukher, Shvartzman beat him to death. 

Shvartzman also tortured the former head of Komsomol, Aleksandr Kosarev, and his former deputy, Valentina Pikina. Pikina refused to sign a confession despite being severely beaten with rubber truncheons, put through a fake execution, and allegedly raped by Shvartsman and his colleague Boris Rodos.

The Meyerhold case 
Vsevolod Meyerhold, who at the time had a greater reputation internationally than any other living theatre director in the USSR, wrote an account shortly before his execution of how he was tortured by Shvartsman. A copy of the document was retained in the archives of the KGB. Meyerhold wrote:
 	

 
Meyerhold was 65 at the time. Isaac Babel was arrested at the same time as Meyerhold, and  interrogated by Shvartsman and Rodos, and therefore it can be assumed that he was subjected to the same treatment.

Later career 
In March 1940, Shvartzman was posted in Vyborg, which had just been seized during the Soviet Finnish War and incorporated in the USSR, and charged with creating an NKVD department in the captured territory. In February 1941, he was appointed deputy head of the NKGB Investigation Department of the USSR.

When the highly decorated Red Army officer Grigory Shtern was arrested in June 1941 and brought in front of Shvartzman's boss, Vsevolod Merkulov for interrogation, Shvartzman hit him with an electric cable, severing his right eye. He apologised to Merkulov for the blood that spilt on the carpet. Unable to bear the pain, Shtern signed a false confession that he was a German spy.

From August 1941, Shvartzman was deputy head of the NKVD / NKGB / MGB Investigation Department of the USSR of Special Importance. On 14 February 1943, he was raised to the rank of colonel of state security. In June 1949 he was sent to Bulgaria to assist in the investigation of Traicho Kostov, a member of the Political Bureau of the Bulgarian Communist Party.

Arrest and execution 
Lev Shvartzman was arrested on 13 July 1951. Viktor Abakumov, head of the MGB, had been arrested the previous day. Both arrests were products of Joseph Stalin's suspicion that there was a Jewish plot against him, inspired by the creation of the state of Israel. Abakumov had failed to take seriously the case being put together by his subordinate, Mikhail Ryumin, which became known  as the Doctors' plot. Shvartzman was the highest ranking Jewish officer in the MGB, and the first of many to be arrested. Under interrogation, Shvartzman confessed to being a 'Jewish nationalist' and the linchpin of a terrorist organisation, organised with the connivance of Abakumov, made up of every senior Jewish officer in the security officers. According to the former MGB officer Pavel Sudoplatov:

After Stalin's death, the Doctors' Plot was exposed as a fabrication, and Lavrenti Beria, who had regained control of the security services, offered Shvartzman a deal, that if he admitted extracting false confessions under torture, the charge of being a Zionist conspirator would be dropped, and he would receive a prison sentence. That offer was withdrawn after Beria's own downfall. Shvartzman was sentenced to death on 3 March 1955, and executed on 13 May 1955 after the Presidium of the USSR Supreme Council rejected a request for pardon.

References 

1907 births
1955 deaths
NKVD officers
Communist Party of the Soviet Union members
Cheka
People from Cherkasy Oblast
People from Kiev Governorate
Jews from the Russian Empire
Soviet Jews in the military
Jews executed by the Soviet Union
Soviet colonels
People executed by the Soviet Union by firearm
Burials at Donskoye Cemetery
Recipients of the Order of the Red Star